The Israelite Church of God in Jesus Christ (ICGJC, also Israelite Church-God & Jesus), formerly known as the Israeli Church of Universal Practical Knowledge, is an American organization of Black Hebrew Israelites. Its headquarters are in New York City, and in 2008 had churches in cities in 10 US states. The Israelite Church of God in Jesus Christ is the second largest Black Hebrew Israelite organization in the United States, the first being the Israel United in Christ.

Its leader (known as "Chief High Priest") until his death in April 2020 was Tazadaqyah.  The Church has also been described as openly racist, sexist and homophobic.

History

The group formerly had its headquarters at One West 125th Street in Harlem, then known as the Israeli School of Universal Practical Knowledge, and its wider movement is known as the One West Camp, including offshoots such as the modern Israelite School of Universal Practical Knowledge.

Beliefs
The Church teaches that the descendants of the Ten Lost Tribes and true biblical Jews are the Black Americans, West Indians, and Native Americans of North and South America and those scattered throughout the whole planet, but not the Jewish people or the Africans. The group claims that the "Black Israelites" have divine favor and inspiration and are superior to "Edomites" (white people) and all other non-Israelite people. They also hold strong apocalyptic views regarding the end of the world. The Church believes that Yahawashi (Jesus) is God's divine Son and Messiah, and the redeemer for the sins of the Israelites and no other nation, that the Old and New Testament and Apocrypha are inspired Scripture, but the group does not believe in the traditional doctrine of the Trinity.

Organization

Ranking system
Positions in the Israelite church which may only be filled by a high priest at the higher orders include Bishop, Chief Priest, Apostle, and/or Holy Apostle. These leaders are primarily responsible for the spiritual welfare of the members and the administration of local church units. However, they have also subservient positions that are filled by other men when they are "elevated" by the "spirit". These are 13 shield generals, all the way down to 1 shield generals. Captains of 10,000 to Captains of 1,000. Top Officers of 5,000 down to Top Officers of 500. Officers of 100, and recruits.

Perhaps the most prominent leader of the church was Tazadaqyah (Jermaine Grant), who rose in to power of the church in the late 1990s. Tazadaqyah was proclaimed by many of his followers to be the God-sent "Comforter" of the Nation of Israel.

The Israelite Church and its various splinter groups can be loosely grouped together as sects, which advocate a Hebrew and Authorized King James Version-only approach to the Bible (i.e. they endorse only the Hebrew/Greek and AKJV versions of the Bible), and the notion that Caucasians are Edomites.

Controversies

Lawsuit over doll prototype
In 2013, the Israelite Church of God in Jesus Christ ordered action figures cast in the image of their leader (Chief High Priest Tazadaqyah) from a toymaker. When they received the dolls they sued the toymaker (Vicale Corp) because of the dolls complexion. The church complained that the dolls did not look like Tazadaqyah and were not black enough, that the Connecticut toymaker put "pointed noses and faces" dolls. The church also complained that half of them "were light brown" instead of "dark brown," according to the court papers.

Perceived enemies
According to the Southern Poverty Law Center, the group lists among its enemies white people, "who they preach are descended from a race of red, hairy beings, known as Edomites, who were spawned by Esau, the twin brother of Jacob" (later known as Israel) in the Old Testament. "Equally hated" are "fraudulent" Jews (i.e., the people known to the world today as Jews), "the synagogue of Satan," Asians, promiscuous black women, abortionists, continental Africans (who, according to the Church and other extremist Israelites, "sold the lost tribes of Israel, who were black, to European slave traders"), and gay people, who "according to extremist Israelites should all be put to death".

Allegations of black supremacy and racism
In late 2008, the Southern Poverty Law Center (SPLC) described the Church and other black supremacist Hebrew Israelite groups as  "the extremist fringe" of the movement. It wrote that the members of such groups "believe that Jews are devilish impostors and ... openly condemn whites as evil personified, deserving only death or slavery". The SPLC also said that "most Hebrew Israelites are neither explicitly racist nor anti-Semitic and do not advocate violence". In 2017, they listed the group as a black nationalist hate group.

The Black Hebrew groups characterized as black supremacist by the SPLC include the Nation of Yahweh  and the Israelite Church of God in Jesus Christ. Also, the Anti-Defamation League has written that the "12 Tribes of Israel" website, maintained by a Black Hebrew group, promotes hatred and black supremacy.

Fraud and tax evasion charges and death of Tazadaqyah 
In April 2018, the leader of the Church Jermaine Grant, known as Tazadaqyah, and the Church treasurer, Lincoln Warrington, were arrested on fraud and tax charges. The United States Attorney for the District of New Jersey alleged the men "used their positions to divert millions of dollars for Grant’s personal use and benefit." Grant and Warrington pleaded guilty to evading tax after using an entertainment company to divert funds from the church members for their own benefit, spending 5.3 million dollars on a lavish lifestyle without declaring the money to the government.

In January 2020, Grant was sentenced to 18 months in federal prison while Warrington was sentenced to 12 months and a day. They were also to be under three years of supervised release. The federal prison system has no offer of parole. Before he was to report to prison, Grant died on April 1, 2020, from complications of COVID-19. Some former church members described Grant as a cult leader who had gained complete influence of his follower’s lives through manipulation and belittlement.

See also 

 African-American – Jewish relations#Black Hebrew Israelites
 Afro-American religion
 Alliance of Black Jews
 Groups claiming an affiliation with the ancient Israelites

References

External links
ICGJC Holy Conception Unit
ICGJC Pittsburgh Division

Black Hebrew Israelites
Black supremacy
Nontrinitarian denominations
Religious belief systems founded in the United States